Mail Order Monsters is an action-strategy computer game created by Paul Reiche III, Evan Robinson, and Nicky Robinson.  It was published by Electronic Arts (Ariolasoft in  Europe) for the Commodore 64 in 1985, then released for Atari 8-bit family in 1986.  Players create monsters which they can use to battle multiplayer or against computer-controlled opponents.

Gameplay 

The players create a variety of monsters and equip them with futuristic and modern weapons to do battle. Monsters can be further customized through buying special abilities, such as adding tentacles to use advanced weaponry.  Two players can fight against each other, play capture the flag, or compete for a high score against a computer-controlled horde.  In single-player mode, the computer controls an opponent to fight.  Battles take place on various different maps that can have tactical effects, such as mountains for agile monsters to hide behind during combat.  Monsters can be stored on diskette and can be upgraded by victories against other monsters or computer opponents.

Development
Reiche had previously worked with designers Jon Freeman and Anne Westfall of Free Fall Associates on the game Archon for EA.  The game was originally envisioned as dark and gritty, but Electronic Arts demanded a more whimsical style. During this development, Reiche became fascinated with his friend Greg Johnson's development on Starflight, and spent a few weeks consulting on it before he realized he was "supposed to be working on Mail Order Monsters".

Reception 
Ahoy! stated that Mail Order Monsters was a "very good game" that did not reach "true excellence" because of insufficient combat tactics, and suggested that it was best for younger players.  Writing in Vintage Games, Bill Loguidice and Matt Barton identify it as a precursor to the Pokémon series.

In a retrospective, Levi Buchanan of IGN said that although he would love to see a remake, any new version, updated to suit modern gamers, would necessarily have to diverge from what made the game unique in 1985.

References

External links 
 
 Mail Order Monsters at Atari Mania

1985 video games
Ariolasoft games
Atari 8-bit family games
Commodore 64 games
Dinosaurs in video games
Electronic Arts games
Action video games
Strategy video games
Video games developed in the United States